The 1991 San Francisco mayoral election was held on November 5, 1991, with a runoff election on December 10 that year. Incumbent mayor Art Agnos, after having won nearly 70% of the vote in 1987, scraped by with less than a third of the vote in the first round and was narrowly unseated by Chief of Police Frank Jordan in the runoff.

Results

First round

Runoff

References

1991 California elections
Mayoral elections in San Francisco
San Francisco
1991 in San Francisco